Luteuthis dentatus, also known as Lu's jellyhead, is a medium-sized species of cirrate octopus found near New Zealand.

References

External links

Octopuses
Cephalopods of Oceania
Endemic fauna of New Zealand
Endemic molluscs of New Zealand
Molluscs described in 1999
Molluscs of the Pacific Ocean
Molluscs of New Zealand